The Macedonian Third League ( - Makedonska Treta Liga) is the third highest football competition in North Macedonia.

In 2019–20, the competition will be divided into five divisions named Third League - North (Трета Лига - Север), Third League - Center (Трета Лига - Центар), Third League - Southeast (Трета Лига - Југоисток), Third League - West (Трета Лига - Запад) and Third League - Southwest (Трета Лига-Југозапад). At the end of the season, the winners of the North, West and Southwest divisions will be play in a play-off for promotion to the Macedonian Second League, while the winners of Center and Southeast divisions will be directly promoted to the Second League. The bottom teams from all divisions are relegated to the Macedonian Municipal Leagues.

Winners

Key

1992–1994

1994–2000

2000–2004

2004–2017

2017–2020

2020–present

2022–23 teams

North 
 1 Aerodrom Skopje
 2 Bashkimi Kumanovo
 3 Bashkimi Ljuboten
 4 Besa-Vlazrimi Slupchane
 5 Bratstvo-Vlaznimi Sredno Konjari
 6 Euromilk Gorno Lisiche
 7 Fortuna
 8 Ilinden Skopje
 9 Kadino
 10 Kumanovo
 11 Madjari Solidarnost
 12 Petrovec
 13 Rashtak
 14 Rinia 98 Dolno Svilare
 15 SSK Nova
 16 Volkovo

South 
 1 Buchin
 2 Golemo Konjari
 3 Kanatlarci
 4 Lokomotiva Gradsko
 5 Marena
 6 Mladost 1930 Krivogashtani
 7 Obrshani
 8 Pitu Guli
 9 Prevalec
 10 Rosoman 83
 11 Sloga 1976 Lazhani
 12 Vardar Negotino

East 
 1 Akademija Cheshinovo-Obleshevo
 2 Bregalnica Golak
 3 Dojransko Ezero
 4 Karbinci
 5 Malesh
 6 Osogovo
 7 Ovche Pole
 8 Pobeda Valandovo
 9 Rudar Probishtip
 10 Spartmani Gradsko Baldovci
 11 Tiverija
 12 Vardarski

West 
 1 Drita
 2 Kamjani
 3 Ljuboten
 4 Napredok
 5 Proleter Tumchevishte
 6 Reçica
 7 Trabzonspor
 8 Vëllazërimi 77
 9 Vëllazërimi Junior
 10 Zajazi

Southwest 
 1 Demir Hisar
 2 Idnina Borovec
 3 Korabi
 4 Kravari
 5 Lirija Grnchari
 6 Makedonija Vranishta
 7 Novaci
 8 Prespa
 9 Sateska
 10 Velmej
 11 Vlaznimi Struga
 12 Young Team

Notes

1. : Metalurg Veles was withdraw from the Second League days before the start of the season, their place was taken by Lozar.
2. : Lokomotiva was promoted after the win in the additional play-off match against Korabi because was the Second League expanded after the play-off chaos.
3. : Babi was promoted because Bregalnica Delchevo was rejected the promotion.
4. : Shkupi was lost promotion play-offs, but due to the merger with Korzo the club was promoted.
5. : Vëllazërimi was lost promotion play-offs, but due to the merger with Vrapčište the club was promoted.
6. : Novaci was lost promotion play-offs, but due to the withdrawal of Mladost Carev Dvor from the Second League the club was promoted.
7. : Tikvesh was promoted due to the withdrawal of Ljubanci from the Second League.
8. : Dojransko Ezero was rejected the promotion to the Second League - East.
9. : Teteks was promoted due to the merger with Labunishta.
10. : The 2019–20 and 2020–21 seasons were abandoned due to the COVID-19 pandemic in North Macedonia.
11. : Lokomotiva was promoted due to the withdrawal of Pehchevo from the Second League.

References

External links
MacedonianFootball.com
Football Federation of Macedonia 

 
3
Third level football leagues in Europe